The 1998 San Francisco Giants season was the Giants' 116th season in Major League Baseball, their 41st season in San Francisco since their move from New York following the 1957 season, and their 39th at 3Com Park at Candlestick Point. The team finished in second place in the National League West with an 89–74 record, 9½  games behind the San Diego Padres.

Offseason
 November 11, 1997: Chris Singleton and Alberto Castillo were traded by the Giants to the New York Yankees for Charlie Hayes and cash.
 November 21, 1997: Brent Mayne was signed as a free agent by the Giants.
 December 6, 1997: Danny Darwin was signed as a free agent by the Giants.
 January 21, 1998: Alex Diaz was signed as a free agent by the Giants.
January 29, 1998: Jalal Leach was traded by the Seattle Mariners with Scott Smith (minors) to the San Francisco Giants for David McCarty.

Regular season

Opening Day starters
Rich Aurilia
Barry Bonds
Shawn Estes
Darryl Hamilton
Stan Javier
John Johnstone
Jeff Kent
Bill Mueller
J. T. Snow

Season standings

Record vs. opponents

Notable transactions
 April 6, 1998: Jalal Leach was released by the San Francisco Giants.
 May 11, 1998: Jalal Leach was signed as a free agent with the San Francisco Giants.
 June 2, 1998: Cody Ransom was drafted by the Giants in the 9th round of the 1998 Major League Baseball draft. Player signed June 4, 1998.
 July 23, 1998: Joe Carter was traded by the Baltimore Orioles to the San Francisco Giants for Darin Blood (minors).
 September 14, 1998: Alex Diaz was released by the Giants.

Roster

Player stats

Batting

Starters by position
Note: Pos = Position; G = Games played; AB = At bats; H = Hits; Avg. = Batting average; HR = Home runs; RBI = Runs batted in

Other batters
Note: G = Games played; AB = At bats; H = Hits; Avg. = Batting average; HR = Home runs; RBI = Runs batted in

Pitching

Starting pitchers
Note: G = Games pitched; IP = Innings pitched; W = Wins; L = Losses; ERA = Earned run average; SO = Strikeouts

Other pitchers
Note: G = Games pitched; IP = Innings pitched; W = Wins; L = Losses; ERA = Earned run average; SO = Strikeouts

Relief pitchers
Note: G = Games pitched; W = Wins; L = Losses; SV = Saves; ERA = Earned run average; SO = Strikeouts

Award winners
 1998 Jeff Kent 2B, Willie Mac Award
All-Star Game

Farm system

LEAGUE CHAMPIONS: San Jose, Salem-Keizer

References

External links
 1998 San Francisco Giants at Baseball Reference
 1998 San Francisco Giants at Baseball Almanac

San Francisco Giants seasons
San Francisco Giants Season, 1998
San Francisco Giants